David Henry Williams (March 19, 1819 – June 1, 1891) was a railroad surveyor, civil engineer and writer in civilian life. He was a volunteer in the United States Army during the Mexican–American War and a volunteer Union Army colonel during the American Civil War. He was appointed colonel of the 82nd Pennsylvania Infantry Regiment on July 23, 1861. He was appointed a brigadier general in the Union Army on November 29, 1862 but his appointment expired on March 4, 1863 without being confirmed by the United States Senate. His actual highest rank remained colonel. After the expiration of his appointment in 1863, Williams resigned from the Union Army and returned to his career as a civil engineer and, after his health soon declined, a writer for newspapers and magazines.

Early life 
David Henry Williams was born in Otsego County, New York  on March 19, 1819.

Williams moved to Detroit, Michigan in 1837. He was a railroad surveyor for 10 years.

Mexican–American War and aftermath 
Williams served as a volunteer in the Mexican–American War. Historian Ezra J. Warner wrote that Williams's obituary stated that he served in the Mexican-American War but he is not listed as an officer in F. B. Heitman's Historical Register. Historian Stewart Sifakis wrote that Williams served "apparently as an enlisted man."

After the Mexican-American War, Williams moved to Allegheny, Pennsylvania, now part of Pittsburgh, Pennsylvania. He practiced engineering and became interested in the militia.

American Civil War 
The 82nd Pennsylvania Infantry Regiment was organized as the 31st Pennsylvania Infantry Regiment and served under that designation until the Battle of Fair Oaks. Thereafter, the 2nd Reserve Regiment was given the designation 31st Pennsylvania Infantry Regiment and the original regiment was renumbered as the 82nd Pennsylvania Infantry Regiment. Williams was the first colonel of the regiment, having been appointed July 23, 1861.

Williams commanded the regiment during the Peninsula Campaign, where the unit was in action at the Siege of Yorktown and at the Seven Days Battles during which the regiment suffered heavy casualties at the Battle of Seven Pines and Battle of Malvern Hill. The regiment did not become engaged in heavy combat in the Maryland Campaign or the Battle of Fredericksburg and suffered few losses in them.

Williams was appointed a brigadier general on November 29, 1862. The appointment expired on March 4, 1863 without having been confirmed.

Warner notes that Williams's last appearance in the Official Records was January 31, 1863 when he was commander of the 82nd Pennsylvania Infantry Regiment in the division commanded by Charles Devens.

Williams resigned from the Union Army in early 1863 and returned to Allegheny (Pittsburgh).

Later life and death 
Williams returned to engineering after he resigned from the Union Army. Warner states that he was a professor of engineering after his return to Allegheny. After a short time, his health deteriorated and he became a prolific writer for newspapers and magazines.

David Henry Williams died on June 1, 1891 at Allegheny, Pennsylvania. He is buried at Allegheny Cemetery, Pittsburgh, Pennsylvania.

Notes

References 
 Eicher, John H., and David J. Eicher, Civil War High Commands. Stanford: Stanford University Press, 2001. .
 Sifakis, Stewart. Who Was Who in the Civil War. New York: Facts On File, 1988. .
 Warner, Ezra J. Generals in Blue: Lives of the Union Commanders. Baton Rouge: Louisiana State University Press, 1964. .

1819 births
1897 deaths
United States Army officers
Union Army colonels
People of Pennsylvania in the American Civil War
People of Michigan in the American Civil War
People of New York (state) in the American Civil War
American military personnel of the Mexican–American War
Burials at Allegheny Cemetery